Walter Browne "Kerry" Woodson IV (born May 18, 1969) is an American former professional baseball pitcher.

Career
Woodson pitched at Carmel High School (Carmel, California) where he studied under the school's effective pitching coach Guy Dubets. Drafted by the Seattle Mariners in the 29th round (747th overall) of the 1988 Major League Baseball draft, Woodson would go on to work his way up through the organization's farm system. The young baseball athlete made his minor league debut with the Bellingham Mariners in 1989 and was promoted to the Mariners' Single-A affiliate (San Bernardino Spirit) the following season. Woodson resided in Carmel, California when he began his professional baseball career. He appeared in eight games in Major League Baseball (MLB) for the Seattle Mariners, in 1992. Woodson also pitched briefly in Taiwan for the Brother Elephants of the Chinese Professional Baseball League (CPBL), in 1999.

References

External links

1969 births
Living people
American expatriate baseball players in Canada
American expatriate baseball players in Taiwan
Arizona League Mariners players
Baseball players from California
Baseball players from Florida
Bellingham Mariners players
Brother Elephants players
Calgary Cannons players
Colorado Springs Sky Sox players
Jacksonville Suns players
Major League Baseball pitchers
Nashua Pride players
People from Carmel-by-the-Sea, California
Riverside Pilots players
San Bernardino Spirit players
San Jose City Jaguars baseball players
Seattle Mariners players
Somerset Patriots players
Sonoma County Crushers players